Salsomaggiore Terme is a town and comune located in the Italian province of Parma, in the region of Emilia-Romagna. Located at the foot of the Apennines, its warm saline waters made this a popular Spa town.

History
In the first half of the 19th century, during the reign of Marie Louise, Duchess of Parma, the thermal waters of Salsomaggiore became attractive to visitors for having therapeutic purposes. The mineral waters of Salsomaggiore belong to the bromo-iodine group salty waters. The main focus of the town became its baths, notably the "terme" located in the center. 

The town remains attractive to visitors. Since 2007 Salsomaggiore is home of the European Festival called Incontrarsi a Salsomaggiore, a celebration of art, music and theater dedicated to women and their health. Around the central piazza are clothing shops and a gelateria. The town has a large number of villas and hotels some of whom (like the Grand Hotel Regina), have events such Miss Italia competition, held here until 2010. Two nearby villages, Salsominore and Tabiano, also have thermal springs. Salsomaggiore Terme is a World Trade Center (WTC).

Climate

Sports
From March 27 to April 9, 2022, the 45th World Bridge Championship was held here.

People
 Dina Barberini (1862–1932), soprano

Frazioni
Bargone, Cangelasio, Ceriati, Contignaco-Cella, Costa, Costamarenga, Fornacchia, Gorzano, I Passeri, Longone-Colombaia, Montauro, Pie' di Via, Pieve di Cusignano, Rossi, Salsominore, San Vittore, Scipione Castello, Scipione Ponte, Tabiano Bagni, Tabiano Castello, Tosini, Vascelli.

Twin cities
 Luxeuil-les-Bains, France
 Hammam-Lif, Tunisia
 Yalta, Ukraine

References

Sources

External links 
 Official tourism website
 Official Cultural Festival

Cities and towns in Emilia-Romagna
Spa towns in Italy